Sean Melton (born October 29, 1994) is an American artistic gymnast. A prodigious junior, he currently represents the Ohio State Buckeyes in the NCAA, and is a member of the United States men's national gymnastics team.

Personal life
Melton was born in Orlando, Florida to parents Sidney and Debbie Melton. He has two siblings; Jordan and Raelyn Melton. He attended Freedom High School and The First Academy, both in Orlando; he graduated high school in 2013.

References

External links 
 
 

1994 births
American male artistic gymnasts
People from Orlando, Florida
Living people